Hans Wellesley Hamilton, 2nd Baron HolmPatrick  (8 August 1886 – 5 September 1942) was an Anglo-Irish soldier and peer.

Hamilton was the only son of Ion Hamilton, who was raised to the peerage in 1897 as Baron HolmPatrick. His father, grandfather James Hans Hamilton and great-grandfather Hans Hamilton all served as Members of Parliament for County Dublin. His mother, Lady Victoria Alexandrina Wellesley, was the daughter of Major-General Lord Charles Wellesley, granddaughter of the Duke of Wellington, and goddaughter of Queen Victoria.

He attended Eton College followed by the Royal Military Academy Sandhurst. He inherited the barony in 1898 after his father's death. In 1906, he was commissioned in the 16th Lancers, and was adjutant from 1912 to 1914. He was wounded in the First World War, during which he was promoted to captain and was a brigade-major and formerly captain in the Lancers. He was mentioned in dispatches three times, and awarded the Military Cross in the 1915 Birthday Honours. awarded the Distinguished Service Order in the 1919 New Year Honours. He later served as Deputy Lieutenant for County Dublin and was provincial commissioner for the Province of Leinster Boy Scouts.

On 27 October 1925, he married Lady Edina Dorothy Hope Ainsworth (née Conyngham), fourth daughter of Henry Conyngham, 4th Marquess Conyngham, three months after her divorce from her first husband, Sir Thomas Ainsworth, 2nd Baronet. HolmPatrick died in 1942 at the family seat at Abbotstown, Castleknock. He was survived by one daughter and one son, James Hans Hamilton, who succeeded as the third baron. Lady HolmPatrick died in 1964.

References

Book cited

1866 births
1942 deaths
Barons in the Peerage of the United Kingdom
Recipients of the Military Cross
Companions of the Distinguished Service Order
Deputy Lieutenants in Ireland
People educated at Eton College